On 23 October 2015, Twenty-three people were killed and several others were wounded when a suicide bomber blast up in a procession of Shia Muslims in Jacobabad, Sindh, on Muharram 9. In this incident 32 people were injured.

See also 
 Targeted killings in Pakistan
 Terrorist incidents in Pakistan in 2015

References 

2015 in Sindh
2015 murders in Pakistan 
2010s crimes in Sindh
21st-century mass murder in Pakistan 
Islamic terrorist incidents in 2015  
2015 bombing
Lashkar-e-Jhangvi attacks
Mass murder in 2015
Mass murder in Sindh
October 2015 crimes in Asia
October 2015 events in Pakistan
Suicide bombings in 2015
Suicide bombings in Sindh
Terrorist incidents in Pakistan in 2015 
Violence against Shia Muslims in Pakistan